Dulishan is a railway station on the Forestry Bureau Alishan Forest Railway line located in Zhuqi Township, Chiayi County, Taiwan.

History
The station was opened on 1 October 1912.

Architecture
The station is located at 743 meters above sea level. The station houses the water crane used to fill water at the steam locomotives of the trains passing through.

See also
 List of railway stations in Taiwan

References

1912 establishments in Taiwan
Alishan Forest Railway stations
Railway stations in Chiayi County
Railway stations opened in 1912